Ernst Scheller (18 July 1899 in Lintel (East Frisia) – 16 January 1942 in Simferopol) was a German Nazi Hauptmann and politician.

Life and work
Scheller was appointed mayor of Marburg in 27.4.1934 by Adolf Hitler and fought on the Eastern Front during World War II. He was injured on 29 December 1941 in battle and died 18 days later on a lazaret in Simferopol.
After his death Walter Voß worked commissarial in Marburg, from March 1944 until the end of the war as commissarial mayor.

References 

1899 births
1942 deaths
People from East Frisia
Nazi Party politicians
German military personnel killed in World War II
Mayors of Marburg
People from the Province of Hanover